Andorra has participated at the Youth Olympic Games in every edition since the inaugural 2010 Games.

Medal tables

Medals by Summer Games

Medals by Winter Games

Medals by summer sport

Medals by winter sport

List of medalists

Summer Games medalists as part of Mixed-NOCs Team

Winter Games

Flag bearers

See also
Andorra at the Olympics
Andorra at the Paralympics

External links
Andorran Olympic Committee

 
Nations at the Youth Olympic Games
Youth sport in Andorra